John Thomas Lupton (1862–1933) was an American lawyer, industrialist and philanthropist who along with Benjamin Thomas and Joseph Whitehead, obtained exclusive rights from Asa Candler to bottle and sell Coca-Cola.

Early life
Lupton was born near Winchester, Virginia, and received a degree in law from the University of Virginia. After a visit to the home of a fellow student, he settled in Chattanooga, Tennessee in 1887.

Lupton soon met Elizabeth Patten, daughter of Chattanooga Medicine Company founder Zeboim Cartter Patten, and they married on November 14, 1889. They had a son, Thomas Cartter Lupton, to whom they left the bulk of their combined wealth.

Career
After his marriage, Lupton took a job as legal counsel to the Chattanooga Medicine Company (now Chattem), eventually becoming company vice president and treasurer.

Lupton, Whitehead and Thomas were the primary investors in the Dixie Coca-Cola Bottling Company, the first Coca-Cola bottling plant in the United States.  Following the business' rapid success, the partners divided the country into territories and gave various family members responsibility over them and began selling bottling franchises. By 1909, nearly 400 bottling operations had been opened.  Lupton's grandson, John T. Lupton II, sold the family's bottling operations back to Coca-Cola in 1986 for $1.4 billion in cash.

Philanthropy
Lupton was a significant contributor to a number of southern schools, colleges and universities; Baylor School in Chattanooga, Oglethorpe University and the University of Tennessee at Chattanooga all have named buildings on their campuses in his honor.

See also
 Coca-Cola Bottling Company
 Cartter Lupton
 Lupton City, Chattanooga
 Lyndhurst Foundation
 Zeboim Cartter Patten
 Benjamin Thomas
 Joseph Whitehead
 1921, received an honorary degree from Oglethorpe University

References

1862 births
1933 deaths
American lawyers
American philanthropists
American drink industry businesspeople
Coca-Cola people
People from Chattanooga, Tennessee
University of Virginia School of Law alumni